SIESTA (Spanish Initiative for Electronic Simulations with Thousands of Atoms) is an original method and its computer program implementation, to efficiently perform electronic structure calculations and ab initio molecular dynamics simulations of molecules and solids. SIESTA uses strictly localized basis sets and the implementation of linear-scaling algorithms. Accuracy and speed can be tuned in a wide range, from quick exploratory calculations to highly accurate simulations matching the quality of other approaches, such as plane-wave and all-electron methods.

SIESTA's backronym is the Spanish Initiative for Electronic Simulations with Thousands of Atoms.

Since 13 May 2016, with the 4.0 version announcement, SIESTA is released under the terms of the GPL open-source license. Source packages and access to the development versions can be obtained from the DevOps platform on GitLab. The latest version Siesta-4.1.5 was released on 4 February 2021.

Features 
SIESTA has these main characteristics:
 It uses the standard Kohn-Sham self-consistent density functional method in the local density (LDA-LSD) and generalized gradient (GGA) approximations, as well as in a non-local function that includes van der Waals interactions (VDW-DF).
 It uses norm-conserving pseudopotentials in their fully non-local (Kleinman-Bylander) form.
 It uses atomic orbitals as a basis set, allowing unlimited multiple-zeta and angular momenta, polarization and off-site orbitals. The radial shape of every orbital is numerical, and any shape can be used and provided by the user, with the only condition that it has to be of finite support, i.e., it has to be strictly zero beyond a user-provided distance from the corresponding nucleus. Finite-support basis sets are the key to calculating the Hamiltonian and overlap matrices in O(N) operations.
 Projects the electron wavefunctions and density onto a real-space grid in order to calculate the Hartree and exchange-correlation potentials and their matrix elements.
 Besides the standard Rayleigh-Ritz eigenstate method, it allows the use of localized linear combinations of the occupied orbitals (valence-bond or Wannier-like functions), making the computer time and memory scale linearly with the number of atoms. Simulations with several hundred atoms are feasible with modest workstations.
 It is written in Fortran 95 and memory is allocated dynamically.
 It may be compiled for serial or parallel execution (under MPI).

SIESTA routinely provides:
 Total and partial energies. 
 Atomic forces.
 Stress tensor.
 Electric dipole moment.
 Atomic, orbital and bond populations (Mulliken). 
 Electron density.
And also (though not all options are compatible):
 Geometry relaxation, fixed or variable cell.
 Constant-temperature molecular dynamics (Nose thermostat).
 Variable cell dynamics (Parrinello-Rahman).
 Spin polarized calculations (collinear or not).
 k-sampling of the Brillouin zone.
 Local and orbital-projected density of states.
 COOP and COHP curves for chemical bonding analysis.
 Dielectric polarization.
 Vibrations (phonons).
 Band structure.
 Ballistic electron transport under non-equilibrium (through TranSIESTA)

Strengths of SIESTA 
SIESTA main strengths are: 
 Flexible accuracy and speed.
 It can tackle computationally demanding systems (systems currently out of the reach of plane-wave codes).
 Efficient parallelization.
The use of a linear combination of numerical atomic orbitals makes SIESTA a flexible and efficient DFT code. SIESTA is able to produce very fast calculations with small basis sets, allowing the computation of systems with thousands of atoms. Alternatively, the use of more complete and accurate bases achieves accuracies comparable to those of standard plane waves calculations, with competitive performance.

Implemented Solutions 
SIESTA is in continuous development since it was implemented in 1996. The main solutions implemented in the current version are:
 Collinear and non-collinear spin-polarised calculations
 Efficient implementation of Van der Waals functional
 Wannier function implementation
 TranSIESTA/TBTrans module with any number of electrodes N>=1
 On-site Coulomb corrections (DFT+U)
 Description of strong localized electrons, transition metal oxides
 Spin-orbit coupling (SOC)
 Topological insulator, semiconductor structures, and quantum-transport calculations
 NEB (Nudged Elastic Band) (interfacing with LUA)

Solutions under development    
 GW approximation
 Time Dependent DFT (TDDFT) 
 Hybrid Functionals
 Band unfolding
 Poisson solver in real space

Post-processing tools 
A number of post-processing tools for SIESTA have been developed. These programs process SIESTA output or provide additional features.

Applications 
Since its implementation, SIESTA has been used by researchers in geosciences, biology, and engineering (extending beyond materials physics and chemistry) and has been applied to a large variety of systems including surfaces, adsorbates, nanotubes, nanoclusters, biological molecules, amorphous semiconductors, ferroelectric films, low-dimensional metals, etc.

See also 
 Quantum chemistry computer programs

References

External links 
 SIESTA website
 SIESTA tutorial - an introduction to SIESTA, addressing the tasks for which SIESTA is better suited than other ab initio codes.
 Download SIESTA
 Professional support for SIESTA

Computational chemistry software
Density functional theory software
Physics software
Scientific simulation software